The 1956 season was the Chicago Bears' 37th in the National Football League.  The team  improved on their 8–4 record from 1955 and finished with a  9–2–1 record, under first-year head coach Paddy Driscoll to win the Western Conference and played in their first NFL championship game since 1946.

The title game against the New York Giants was at Yankee Stadium and the Giants won, 47–7.

Schedule

Note: Intra-conference opponents are in bold text.

Postseason

Standings

Roster

References

Chicago Bears
Chicago Bears seasons
Chicago Bears